The Society for Psychotherapy Research (SPR) is a learned society founded in 1970. It is multidisciplinary, international association for research into psychotherapy. The idea of an international society of psychotherapists was discussed at an annual meeting of the American Psychological Association in 1968.

The Society has chapters in the United Kingdom, the rest of Europe, Latin America, and North America. The Society for Psychotherapy Research also has what it describes as "Area groups" in Australia, Italy, and other specific locations.

The academic journal of the Society for Psychotherapy Research, Psychotherapy Research, is published bi-monthly by Routledge.

Aims and history 
SPR encourages the development of research on psychotherapy as well as aims to support and enhance both the empirical basis and applied value of research on psychotherapy. Psychotherapy research is stimulated, for instance, by providing small research grants for pilot studies which, in turn, enable researchers to later obtain larger grant funding. The society also plays an important role in providing opportunities to psychotherapy researchers for interaction and dialogue by organizing regular meetings to enable communication about research, share methodological innovations, and disseminate research findings and knowledge of their applications. It makes use of print and electronic media to disseminate the results of psychotherapy research and to share ideas related to research methods.

The creation of a Society for Psychotherapy Research goes back to a meeting of psychotherapy researchers in San Francisco in 1968, which was associated to the annual meeting of the American Psychological Association. This meeting was sponsored by small donations of the APA Division of Psychotherapy and the American Academy of Psychotherapists. The founders of the group were Kenneth I. Howard and David Orlinsky, with support from Lester Luborsky, Nathaniel Raskin, and Hans Herrman Strupp. The first official conference took place in Highland Park, Illinois in 1969.

Organization 
As of December 2017, the society consists of four regional chapters, two area groups, and five interest sections. The regional chapters are:
 Europe
 Latin America
 North America
 United Kingdom
In some areas, there are many active SPR members and local meetings are organized. The area groups are:
 Australia
 Italy
In addition to the chapters and area groups, there are sections on specific topics that are of interest to members. As of December 2017, there are five special interest sections:
 Child, adolescent, and family therapy research
 Culture and psychotherapy
 Therapist training and development
 Case study interest group
 Complexity science in psychotherapy

Members 
The society has approximately 1,100 members worldwide. Membership includes a free subscription to Psychotherapy Research.

Annual meetings 
The international annual meetings take place at the end of June and have been organized since 1970. All scientific programs of the meetings are available online, back to the year 1972.

List of international annual meetings 
 2021: 52nd International Annual Meeting, Heidelberg, Germany
 2020: 51st International Annual Meeting, Amherst, MA, USA
 2019: 50th International Annual Meeting, Buenos Aires, Argentina
 2018: 49th International Annual Meeting, Amsterdam, The Netherlands
 2017: 48th International Annual Meeting, Toronto, Canada
 2016: 47th International Annual Meeting, Jerusalem, Israel
 2015: 46th International Annual Meeting, Philadelphia, USA
 2014: 45th International Annual Meeting, Copenhagen, Denmark
 2013: 44th International Annual Meeting, Brisbane, Australia
 2012: 43rd International Annual Meeting, Virginia Beach, USA
 2011: 42nd International Annual Meeting, Bern, Switzerland
 2010: 41st International Annual Meeting, Asilomar, CA, USA
 2009: 40th International Annual Meeting, Santiago de Chile
 2008: 39th International Annual Meeting, Barcelona, Spain
 2007: 38th International Annual Meeting, Madison, WI, USA

Presidents 
The past presidents of the SPR have been:

References

Further reading

External links 
 

Psychology organizations
Psychotherapy organizations
Organizations established in 1970